Espen Aarnes Hvammen (born 13 November 1988) is a Norwegian speed skater specialising in 500 and 1000 m races. Hvammen is a two-time Norwegian champion on the 500 m, and finished top-10 in two World Cup races during the 2010–11 season. Hvammen represents Eidsvold Turn.

References

1988 births
Norwegian male speed skaters
Speed skaters at the 2014 Winter Olympics
Olympic speed skaters of Norway
People from Eidsvoll
Living people
Sportspeople from Viken (county)
21st-century Norwegian people